This article lists diplomatic missions resident in the Comoros.  At present, the capital city of Moroni hosts 6 embassies.  Several other countries accredit ambassadors from other capitals.

Embassies

Moroni

Other delegations or missions
 (Delegation)

Consulates

Mutsamudu
 (Vice Consulate)

Non-resident embassies accredited to the Comoros

Resident in Antananarivo, Madagascar

Resident in Dar es Salaam, Tanzania

Resident in Nairobi, Kenya

Resident in Port Louis, Mauritius

Resident in Pretoria, South Africa

Resident in other cities 

 (Addis Ababa)
 (Harare)
 (Djibouti City)
 (New York City)
 (Addis Ababa)

Closed embassies

See also
Foreign relations of Comoros

See also

Foreign relations of the Comoros
Comoros
Diplomatic missions